Puls is a German, public radio station owned and operated by the Bayerischer Rundfunk (BR).

Every Thursday at 23:45 pm on BR TV, Puls broadcasts the half-hour magazine Puls - quality television of your trust, in which Sebastian Meinberg and Ariane Alter have contributed articles from the categories "We have to talk", "Give it a try", "We celebrate it" as well as "End with fun" present. In addition, the moderators hand over an interesting gift for each show in "The Gift". The episodes and individual contributions were also published online, in part, even before their broadcast on television. Since 2018, the program is only broadcast on the Internet.

Other broadcasts of Puls are launch pad, UMZUG !, as well as Woidboyz in the BR television and on ARD-alpha.

References

Radio stations in Germany
Radio stations established in 2013
2013 establishments in Germany
Mass media in Munich
Bayerischer Rundfunk